The Men's 100 metre butterfly competition of the swimming events at the 2015 World Aquatics Championships was held on 7 August with the heats and the semifinals and 8 August with the final.

Records
Prior to the competition, the existing world and championship records were as follows.

Results

Heats
The heats were held at 10:09

Semifinals
The semifinals were held on 7 August at 18.35.

Semifinal 1

Semifinal 2

Final
The final was held on 8 August at 18:13.

References

Men's 100 metre butterfly